Intersex rights in Malta since 2015 are among the most progressive in the world. Intersex children in Malta have world-first protections from non-consensual cosmetic medical interventions, following the passing into law of the Gender Identity, Gender Expression and Sex Characteristics Act in 2015. All Maltese intersex persons have protection from discrimination. Individuals who seek it can access simple administrative methods of changing sex assignment, with binary and non-binary forms of identification available.

History

Medieval
A 12th-century canon law collection known as the Decretum Gratiani states that "Whether an hermaphrodite may witness a testament, depends on which sex prevails" (Hermafroditus an ad testamentum adhiberi possit, qualitas sexus incalescentis ostendit).

Early modern period
In a court case heard at the Castellania in 1774 during the Order of St John in Malta, 17-year-old Rosa Mifsud from Luqa, later described in clinical literature as a "pseudo-hermaphrodite", petitioned for a change in sex classification from female. Two clinicians were appointed by the court to perform an examination. They found that "the male sex is the dominant one". The examiners were the Physician-in-Chief and a senior surgeon, both working at the Sacra Infermeria. The Grandmaster himself took the final decision for Mifsud to wear male-only clothes from then on.

Contemporary times

In 2013, Malta hosted the third International Intersex Forum in Valletta, where a civil society statement named the Malta declaration was signed. The event was supported by ILGA and ILGA-Europe, and brought together 34 people representing 30 organisations from multiple regions of the world. Local representatives Silvan Agius of ILGA-Europe and Ruth Baldacchino of ILGA hosted and co-organized the event. The declaration affirmed the existence of intersex people, and demanded an end to "discrimination against intersex people and to ensure the right of bodily integrity, physical autonomy and self-determination". Silvan Agius subsequently became human rights policy coordinator at the Ministry for Social Dialogue, and Ruth Baldacchino became co-secretary general of ILGA.

In 2015, Malta adopted world-first protections for intersex people, including protection from non-consensual cosmetic changes to sex characteristics in childhood, and protection from discrimination.

Physical integrity and bodily autonomy 

In April 2015, Malta passed world-first legislation that protects intersex infants and children from non-consensual medical interventions. The Gender Identity Gender Expression and Sex Characteristics Act recognizes a right to bodily integrity and physical autonomy.

The Act was widely welcomed internationally by civil society organizations.

Protection from discrimination

The 2015 Gender Identity Gender Expression and Sex Characteristics Act protects intersex people from discrimination on grounds of "sex characteristics", as well as offering world-first protection from harmful practices. Sex characteristics was defined as follows:

Also in 2015, the Ministry for Education and Employment introduced a policy for trans, gender variant and intersex students in schools, aiming to promote inclusion and combat discrimination.

Identification documents

The same Gender Identity Gender Expression and Sex Characteristics Act introduced new provisions allowing applicants to change their gender identity documents by a simple administrative method. Malta also permits an "X" option on identification documents since 6 September 2017. The first ID card and passport with "X" marker were issued on 23 January 2018.

Marriage
Legislation to enact marriage equality was introduced following a snap election in mid-2017. It went into effect on 1 September 2017.

See also
Malta declaration
Intersex human rights
LGBT rights in Malta

References

Bibliography